Taking a Chance on Love (also known as The Note II: Taking a Chance on Love) is a 2009 American-Canadian made-for-television romance film and a sequel to the hit Hallmark Channel movie The Note. The film was written by Douglas Barr. Angela Hunt, author of the novel The Note, did a novelization of Barr's script. The film aired on Hallmark Channel on January 31, 2009.

Plot
Peyton MacGruder (Genie Francis) is still learning how to be a parent after reuniting with Christine, the daughter she gave up for adoption 18 years earlier. She's also trying to manage her new relationship with King (Ted McGinley), but things get even more complicated when he asks her to marry him.  Peyton is hesitant to take a chance at the happiness she deserves, but a note from a reader of her "Heart Healer" column leads to a new friendship that will teach her there's a time to be cautious and a time to follow your heart.

Cast
 Genie Francis as Peyton McGruder
 Ted McGinley as Kingston "King" Danville
 Katie Boland as Christine Everby
 Kate Trotter as Eve Miller
 Genelle Williams as Mandi

Reception
Taking a Chance on Loves premiere scored a 2.9 household rating with 2.5 million homes, over 3.3 million total viewers and 4.2 million unduplicated viewers for Hallmark Channel. This ranked the movie as the highest-rated ad-supported cable movie of the week and the highest-rated Prime Time telecast of the day. It also boosted Hallmark Channel to rank #1 in Prime Time for the day on Saturday. The film helped rank Hallmark Channel #7 in Prime Time for the week with a 1.1 household rating, 983,000 homes and over 1.3 million total viewers.

Sequel
A third installment, Notes from the Heart Healer, was broadcast on May 12, 2012. The main cast returned for the film.

References

External links
 Taking a Chance on Love at Hallmark Channel
 

2009 television films
2009 films
2009 romantic drama films
American romantic drama films
Canadian drama television films
Canadian romantic drama films
English-language Canadian films
Television sequel films
Films shot in Ontario
Hallmark Channel original films
Films directed by Douglas Barr
2000s American films
2000s Canadian films